Lake Catherine is an unincorporated community and census-designated place (CDP) in Lake County, Illinois, United States. Per the 2020 census, the population was 1,279.

Geography
Lake Catherine is located in northwestern Lake County at  (42.483969, -88.124172). It is bordered to the north by Kenosha County, Wisconsin, to the east by the village of Antioch, and to the west by the community of Channel Lake. It surrounds Lake Catherine, a bay of Channel Lake, one of the Chain O'Lakes of northern Illinois.

Illinois Route 173 passes through the community, leading east through Antioch village  to Zion and west  to Richmond.

Demographics

2020 census

Note: the US Census treats Hispanic/Latino as an ethnic category. This table excludes Latinos from the racial categories and assigns them to a separate category. Hispanics/Latinos can be of any race.

2000 Census
At the 2000 census, there were 1,490 people, 594 households and 418 families residing in the CDP. The racial makeup of the CDP was 97.72% White, 0.81% African American, 0.07% Native American, 0.34% from other races, and 1.07% from two or more races. Hispanic or Latino of any race were 2.28% of the population.

There were 594 households, of which 29.1% had children under the age of 18 living with them, 56.2% were married couples living together, 9.3% had a female householder with no husband present, and 29.5% were non-families. 25.6% of all households were made up of individuals, and 7.9% had someone living alone who was 65 years of age or older. The average household size was 2.51 and the average family size was 3.00.

23.1% of the population were under the age of 18, 6.7% from 18 to 24, 30.1% from 25 to 44, 27.2% from 45 to 64, and 12.8% who were 65 years of age or older. The median age was 39 years. For every 100 females, there were 106.4 males. For every 100 females age 18 and over, there were 106.5 males.

The median household income was $56,970 and the median family income was $61,607. Males had a median income of $47,000 and females $35,076. The per capita income was $23,401. About 7.6% of families and 8.5% of the population were below the poverty line, including 5.5% of those under age 18 and 6.4% of those age 65 or over.

References

Census-designated places in Illinois
Census-designated places in Lake County, Illinois